The 1988 French motorcycle Grand Prix was the eleventh round of the 1988 Grand Prix motorcycle racing season. It took place on the weekend of 22–24 July 1988 at the 5.81 km (3.61 mi) Paul Ricard Circuit.

500 cc race report
Frenchman Christian Sarron claimed his 5th pole position in a row on his Yamaha YZR500, and his last ever in 500 GP.

Like most of the mid-field, Niall Mackenzie (Honda) jumped the start and raced to the lead, but the race was allowed to continue and no penalties were handed out by race officials. On the 1.8 km long Mistral Straight for the first time Wayne Gardner used the power of his factory Rothmans Honda to shoot to the lead from Kevin Schwantz (Suzuki), Mackenzie and Wayne Rainey (Yamaha).

Gardner and pole sitter Sarron battled for the lead with Schwantz and Eddie Lawson (Yamaha), who was battling a shoulder injury suffered in the previous race in Yugoslavia only one week before and had turned to famed Austrian Willi Dungl to help him get fit to race. Gardner's Honda had the advantage on the Mistral Straight over all but Lawson's YZR500, but Lawson, Sarron and Schwantz had the advantage through the turns, though the Suzuki was clearly the slowest on the Pit and Mistral straights. The quartet gradually pulled away from Rainey, who in turn pulled away from a pack including Randy Mamola (Cagiva), Didier de Radiguès (Yamaha), Pierfrancesco Chili (Honda) and Kevin Magee (Yamaha).

Going into the last lap, Gardner had pulled out a two-second lead over the trio and looked set to win his fourth race in a row. However, going through the Courbe de Signes at the end of the Mistral his bike developed mechanical problems when a crankshaft bolt broke loose and found its way into the water pump, though he had a big enough gap over Wayne Rainey to struggle home in 4th place only 5.720 seconds behind Lawson. Gardner's breakdown allowed Lawson to win the race and extend his lead in the championship. Sarron consolidated his second place in the title race, finishing only 0.22 behind the American. In one of the closest top 3 finishes in history, Schwantz finished in 3rd place only 0.24 behind Sarron and less than half a second from winning. Schwantz came out of the final turn and knowing his bike didn't have the acceleration to pass, pulled a wheelie until after crossing the line and celebrated on the cool down lap for gaining an unexpected podium finish.

Wayne Gardner, back in the form that has seen him win the World Championship in 1987, had the consolation of setting the races fastest lap.

1988 was the final time that the French motorcycle Grand Prix would be held on the full length 5.81 km (3.61 mi) Paul Ricard circuit. When Grand Prix racing next returned to the circuit in 1991, the 3.812 km (2.369 mi) 'Club' circuit was used.

500 cc classification

References

External links
1988 French Motorcycle Grand Prix

French motorcycle Grand Prix
French
Motorcycle Grand Prix
French motorcycle Grand Prix